"Winter Dreams" is a short story by F. Scott Fitzgerald that was first published in Metropolitan magazine in December 1922 and later collected in All the Sad Young Men in 1926. The plot concerns the attempts by a young man to win the affections of an upper-class woman. The story, frequently anthologized, is regarded as one of Fitzgerald's finest works "for poignantly portraying the loss of youthful illusions."

In the Fitzgerald canon, the story is considered to be in the "Gatsby-cluster" as many of its themes were later expanded upon in his famous novel The Great Gatsby in 1925. Writing his editor Max Perkins in June 1925, Fitzgerald described "Winter Dreams" as "a sort of first draft of the Gatsby idea."

Background 

The short story was based upon Fitzgerald's unsuccessful romantic pursuit of socialite Ginevra King. A wealthy heiress from a Chicago banking family, Ginevra enjoyed a privileged upbringing and was feted in the Chicago social scene as a member of the elite "Big Four" debutantes during World War I. While teenagers, Ginevra and Fitzgerald met at a sledding party and shared an unconsummated romance from 1915 to 1917, but their budding relationship soon ended when Ginevra's imperious father, Charles G. King, publicly humiliated the impressionable young writer and bluntly told him that "poor boys shouldn't think of marrying rich girls." Heeding her father's advice, Ginevra spurned Fitzgerald due to his lack of financial prospects. Fitzgerald later claimed that Ginevra had rejected him "with the most supreme boredom and indifference." Purportedly, "Fitzgerald was so smitten by King that for years he could not think of her without tears coming to his eyes."

Plot summary 

Dexter Green is a middle-class young man born in rural Minnesota who aspires to be part of the "old money" elite of the American Midwest. His father owns the second most profitable grocery store in the town. To earn money, Dexter works part-time as a teenage caddie at a golf club in Black Bear Lake, Minnesota, where he meets the eleven-year-old Judy Jones. He quits his job rather than be Judy's caddie as he cannot abide acting as one of her obsequious servants.

After college, Dexter becomes involved in a partnership in a laundry business. He returns to the Sherry Island Golf Club and is invited to play golf with the affluent men for whom he once caddied. He encounters Judy Jones again on the golf course, only now she is older and more beautiful. Later in the evening on Black Bear Lake, Dexter swims to a raft where he encounters Judy who is piloting a motor boat. She asks him to drive the boat while she rides behind, aquaplaning. After this encounter, Judy invites Dexter to dinner, and a romance blossoms. However, he soon discovers that he is merely one of a dozen beaus whom she is clandestinely romancing.

After eighteen months, while Judy is vacationing in Florida, Dexter becomes engaged to Irene Scheerer, a kind-hearted but ordinary-looking girl. When Judy returns, however, she again ensnares Dexter's affections and asks him to marry her. Dexter breaks off his engagement with Irene, only to be unceremoniously dropped again by Judy a month later. Unable to cope with this recurrent heartbreak, Dexter joins the American Expeditionary Forces to fight in the Great War.

Seven years later, Dexter has become a successful businessman in New York. He has become wealthy but hasn't visited his home in years. One particular day, a Detroit man named Devlin visits Dexter on a business pretext. During the meeting, Devlin reveals that Judy Simms—formerly Judy Jones—is the wife of one of his friends. Devlin recounts how Judy's beauty has faded, and her husband treats her callously. This news demoralizes Dexter as he still loves Judy. Later Dexter realizes that his dream is gone and that he can never return home.

Critical response 
Fitzgerald biographer Matthew J. Bruccoli described "Winter Dreams" as "the strongest of the Gatsby-cluster stories." He continues:

Scholar Tim Randell has asserted that "Winter Dreams" should be regarded as a crowning literary achievement as Fitzgerald "achieves a dialectical metafiction" in which he deftly criticizes "class relations and print culture." Fitzgerald's short story "identifies ruling class interests as the collective origin of meaning and 'reality' for the entire social body" and "conveys the possibility of counter, collective meanings" driven by class antagonism. Randell argues that the story chronicles a young man's alienation with modernity due to a "lack of communal meaning" and his self-conscious descent into despair and melancholy.

References

Citations

Bibliography

External links 

Complete Text of "Winter Dreams" – University of South Carolina
The New York Times Book Review in March 1926, on All the Sad Young Men
"Metafiction and the Ideology of Modernism in Fitzgerald's 'Winter Dreams'" by Tim Randell, from The F. Scott Fitzgerald Review on JSTOR
 

Short stories by F. Scott Fitzgerald
1922 short stories
1920s short stories
American short stories
Works originally published in Metropolitan Magazine (New York City)